Charles Schaeffer "Pop" Kelchner (August 2, 1875 – September 19, 1958) was an American football, basketball and baseball player and coach. He served as the head basketball coach at Albright College in Myerstown, Pennsylvania from 1900 to 1919.

Head coaching record

Football

References

External links
 
 Biography at Pro Basketball Encyclopedia

1875 births
1958 deaths
Albright Lions baseball coaches
Albright Lions football coaches
Albright Lions men's basketball coaches
Harrisburg Senators players
Kane Mountaineers players
Lafayette Leopards baseball players
Lafayette Leopards football players
Minor league baseball managers
People from Berks County, Pennsylvania
Players of American football from Pennsylvania
Baseball players from Pennsylvania
Basketball coaches from Pennsylvania